Colin Douglas-Smith (11 July 1918 – 20 October 2009) was an Australian rower. He competed in the men's coxed four event at the 1948 Summer Olympics. 

Educated at Geelong Grammar School and the University of Melbourne, where he was a member of Trinity College, he studied Zoology and then Medicine, with his studies interrupted by the Second World War. He served in submarines in the Royal Navy before returning to Australia to complete his medical qualifications. Moving to Western Australia in 1956 after specialized studies in the UK, he became one of Perth's leading obstetricians.

References

1918 births
2009 deaths
Australian male rowers
Olympic rowers of Australia
Rowers at the 1948 Summer Olympics
Sportspeople from Geelong
Royal Australian Navy personnel of World War II
Royal Navy officers of World War II
Royal Navy submariners
20th-century Australian people